Sven Petrus Ekman (31 May 1876, Uppsala – 2 February 1964, Uppsala) was a Swedish zoologist, biogeographer, zoogeographer, and limnologist,<ref name=Vem>Vem är det : Svensk biografisk handbok 1953, ed. Stina Svensson, P A Norstedt & Söners Förlag, Stockholm 1953 p. 263</ref> known for the Ekman grab sampler.

Ekman was the son of the Lutheran pastor Fredrik Ekman and Sofia Ekman, née Svensson. He enrolled at Uppsala University where he received a baccalaureate degree in 1899, a licentiate in 1903, and a doctorate in 1904. He was a lecturer in zoology at Uppsala University from 1904 to 1909 and again from 1916 to 1927. In the intervening years, he taught biology and chemistry at a secondary school in Jönköping from 1909 to 1916. In 1927 he became professor of zoology at Uppsala University; he retired in 1941 as professor emeritus. In 1937 he was elected to the Royal Swedish Academy of Sciences, and in 1939 to the Royal Physiographic Society in Lund.

Ekman rewrote his 1935 German-language book Tiergeographie des Meeres in Swedish and had it translated into English with the title Zoogeography of the Sea (1953). He received the Daniel Giraud Elliot Medal in 1953 for Zoogeography of the Sea''.

The Russian marine scientist, A. I. Kafanov (2006) wrote about the contributions of "Sven Ekman on the 130th anniversary of his birth in the Russian Journal of Marine Biology, especially biogeography and a passage from that article is quoted here:

Ekman was from 1905 married to Frida Bengtsson (1881–1961). They are buried at Uppsala old cemetery. Their son was the artist Erik Ekman (1906–1986).

See also
Van Veen Grab Sampler

References

External links 
Sven Ekman at LIBRIS

Swedish zoologists
Biogeographers
Swedish limnologists
Uppsala University alumni
Academic staff of Uppsala University
Members of the Royal Swedish Academy of Sciences
Members of the Royal Physiographic Society in Lund
1876 births
1964 deaths
Burials at Uppsala old cemetery